Rikia Magha (born 15 October 1993 in Safi) is a Moroccan singer and actress.

Career 
In 2014, she took part in the third edition of the Arab Idol music competition.

In 2015, she revealed Mayhemmak in collaboration with Mahmoud Berhil and Mohamed Noubal, and began a tour in Arab countries.

In July 2019, on the occasion of the Throne Day, Rikia Magha released Lmaghreb W Jamalo, in the format of a music video directed by Noubal.

Coinciding with the 44th anniversary of the Green March, Rikia Magha released a work titled Hadi Sahrati, with rhythms blending modern music and desert tunes. In her second national song of the genre, Magha collaborated with Mohammed Al-Maghraby on the lyrical level, Mehdi Mozayine on the melodic level and Tariq Al-Hujaili for the casting.

In December 2021, Rikia Magha unveils her new single entitled Des Souvenirs, a Raï style title composed by Younes Adam and distributed by Zino Kandour.

Discography 
2015 : Mayhemmak

2016: Khayl Al Qasseed

2017 : Al Layl

2017 : Qadar Qadar

2017: Tleatili Min Ween

2017: Eddunya Doros feat. Fayssal Al Jassem

2018 : Rawaea Fezaa

2018: El Qessayed Enta

2018: Chher W Semana

2018: Tebghi Al Sedq

2019: Lmaghreb W Jamalo

2019: Hada Houa Lmaghrebi feat. Karima Gouit, Redone Berhil et Badr Soultan

2020: Hadi Saharti

2021: Kol Deqqat Qalb

2021: Des Souvenirs

Filmography 
2019: Hal Wayyana

2021 : Alaaeddine

2022 : Alfanar

References 

Moroccan singers
Moroccan actresses
1993 births
Living people
People from Safi, Morocco